The S AM Swiss Architecture Museum is an architecture museum in Basel, Switzerland. Through its program of temporary exhibitions and events, it contributes to international debates on architecture and urban development as well as related socio-political aspects. In addition, the museum issues publications and holds special events in conjunction with the exhibitions. Its premises are located within the Kunsthalle Basel.

Exhibitions 
Since its foundation, the museum has realised over 170 exhibitions. Events in the form of lectures, discussions, talks, workshops, guided tours, and numerous publications accompany the exhibitions. 
 2022 Napoli Super Modern
 2021 Beton 
 2021 Mock-up
 2020 Basel 2050
 2019 Under the Radar
 2019 Swim City
 2018 Dichtelust – Forms of Urban Coexistence in Switzerland
 2017 Bengal Stream
 2017 Schweizweit 
 2015 Bernhard Tschumi 
 2014 Young Swiss Architects
 2012 City Inc. 
 2011 The Object of Zionism 
 2010 Richard Neutra 
 2009 Madelon Vriesendorp
 2008 Balkanology 
 2005 Zaha Hadid  
 2000 Peter Märkli
 1997 New Building in the Alps
 1993 Rafael Moneo
 1992 Livio Vacchini
 1989 Frank O. Gehry
 1988 Herzog & de Meuron 
 1988 Office for Metropolitan Architecture
 1987 Le Corbusier and Raoul La Roche
 1984 Jean Prouvé

See also 
Architecture museums
 Museums in Basel

External links 
 Swiss Architecture Museum website
 Basel Museums Website

Museums in Basel
Architecture museums